Raiwind Junction railway station (Urdu and )  is located in Raiwind town, Lahore district of Punjab province, Pakistan. It serves as the junction between the Karachi–Peshawar Railway Line and Lodhran–Raiwind Branch Line. It is one of the sub-urban stations of Lahore which are served by commuter trains. Many commuters use this station to get access to the city of Lahore.

History
In War of 1965, Raiwind railway station was a hub of logistic and transport efforts of the 1st Armoured Division which was attacking Khemkaran in India. The station was subjected to frequent attacks by the Indian Air Force. According to Indian pilots, Raiwind station was easy to find as they just had to follow the south bound railway line until it reached Raiwind.

It was reconstructed in 2016.

See also
 List of railway stations in Pakistan
 Pakistan Railways

References

Railway stations in Lahore District
Railway stations on Lodhran–Raiwind Line
Railway stations on Karachi–Peshawar Line (ML 1)